The Henry S. Clark Stakes is an American Thoroughbred horse race run annually at Pimlico Race Course in Baltimore, Maryland. Open to horses three-years-old & up, it is contested over a distance of one mile on turf.

The race was named in honor of U.S. Racing Hall of Fame inductee, Henry S. Clark, the "dean of Maryland trainers", who spent 80 of his 95 years on the backstretch of Maryland's race tracks and remained active until his death in February 1999. He was the grandson of another famous Maryland trainer, William Jennings Sr. In 1982, Henry Clark was honored with induction into the Racing Hall of Fame.

Early in his career, Clark was selected by Liz Whitney to train her stable of runners and he sent out his first stakes winner, Blue Cyprus for Whitney at Garden State in 1944. In the late 1940s, Clark began his relationship with Harry & Jane Lunger, training the talented Christiana Stables' horses. Among those under his care were two-time Delaware Handicap winner Obeah (dam of champion Go For Wand), Endine, champion Tempted, Travers Stakes winner Thinking Cap, Belmont Futurity winner and top sire Cyane and Blue Grass Stakes winner Linkage, who finished second in the 1982 Preakness Stakes.

Records 

Speed record: 
 1 mile – 1:33.80 – Private Slip  (2001)

Most wins by a jockey:
 2 – Horacio A. Karamanos (2003, 2006)

Most wins by a trainer:
 2 – Michael Zwiesler (2007, 2008)

Most wins by an owner:
 2 – William S. Farish III (2007, 2008)

Winners of the Henry S. Clark Stakes

See also 

 Henry S. Clark Stakes top three finishers and starters
 Pimlico Race Course
 List of graded stakes at Pimlico Race Course

References 

Turf races in the United States
Ungraded stakes races in the United States
Sports competitions in Baltimore
Pimlico Race Course
Horse races in Maryland
Recurring sporting events established in 2001